Thomas Armstrong (born 1898 - 1967) was a footballer who played in The Football League for Liverpool. He also played for Preston North End.

References

English footballers
Liverpool F.C. players
Preston North End F.C. players
English Football League players
1898 births
Year of death missing
Association football goalkeepers